The Campeonato Mineiro Módulo II  is the second tier of football league of the state of Minas Gerais, Brazil.

Participants
2022 edition

List of champions

Amateur era

The first era of second tier of Minas Gerais football was the Serie B of the championship of municipality of Belo Horizonte.

Primeira Divisão

From 1961 to 1968 the second level was called First Division and the first level, Extra Division.

Divisão de Acesso

In 1969, the Access Division was the second level, and the First Division was the third.

Primeira Divisão

From 1970 to 1976 the second level was not played because "Promotion Law" (Lei do Acesso) had been revoked by CND (National Sports Council). The Promotion Law returned in 1976 and, thus, state championships could again have promotion between divisions.

Segunda Divisão

Módulo II

Notes

Unaí EC currently  disputes the Campeonato Brasiliense, due to proximity of the city of Unaí to the Distrito Federal.
When promoted to Campeonato Brasileiro Série B in 2011, due to problems with stadium capacity, Ituiutaba EC has moved from Ituiutaba to Varginha, and changed this name to the currently Boa Esporte Clube.

Titles by team 

Teams in bold still active.

By city

External links
 FMF official website

References

 
Mineiro